Philips Consumer Lifestyle is a subsidiary of the Dutch multinational electronics company Philips which produces consumer electronics and small appliances. It is the only Philips company headquartered in Amsterdam, the Netherlands. The Americas division is headquartered in Stamford, Connecticut. 

Philips Consumer Lifestyle was formed in 2008 from the merger of Philips Consumer Electronics and Philips Domestic Appliances and Personal Care.

Philips receives royalties from the sale of every CD, DVD and Blu-ray.

History

While Philips' first product was manufactured in 1891, the first product that would fit in the Consumer Electronics division was a television, experimentally manufactured in 1925. In 1927, Philips began producing radios. Only five years later, Philips had sold one million of them. One other major product release came in 1963, when the Compact Cassette was introduced.

After Philips Consumer Electronics acquired companies as Magnavox and Sylvania in the late-1970s, Philips managed to sell their 100-millionth TV-set in 1984. Philips still is the European television market leader, as well as the third in the world.

Because of the enormous growth, Philips decided to split up their company divisions during the 1990s. While Philips CE contains most of the Consumer Electronics, other products such as Philips' shavers (Philishave and Norelco) were located under the Domestic Appliances division.

As of 2012 Philips is no longer directly involved in TV manufacturing, because it has outsourced it to a joint venture with TPV Technology, called TP Vision.

Philips announced in January 2013 that it agreed to sell its consumer electronics division to Japan-based Funai Electric Co. for Euro 150 million (US$201.8 million). This would leave mainly consumer products for personal care and health in this division of Philips. However, in October 2013, Philips announced that it would not proceed with the sale, instead initiating litigation against Funai, alleging breach of contract by Funai.

Product timeline
1949, began selling television sets.
1951, introduced the Philishave two-headed rotary shaver, marketed in the USA under the Norelco name.
1963, introduced the Compact Cassette.
1963, introduced the first domestic home video tape recorder, the 405 line 1" tape reel model EL3400.
1978, introduced the Laserdisc player, using technology invented in the 1960s.
1978, introduced the Philips Videopac G7000 (pictured below), a home video game console developed by its Magnavox division. Marketed in the United States as the Odyssey2 console. Variations of the console were sold worldwide through 1984.
1979, introduced the Video 2000-system: a technically superior design, but a commercial failure.
1982, launched the Compact Disc in partnership with Sony.
1983, participated in developing the MSX home computer standard. This computer standard was mainly popular in Japan and the Netherlands.
1991, introduced the CD-i, the Compact Disc Interactive system, which had many video-game console-type features, but was not a sales success.
1992, launched the ill-fated Digital Compact Cassette format.
1995, manufactured the Atari Jaguar's CD add-on for Atari.
1999, launched the Super Audio CD in partnership with Sony.
2000, launched the luminaire Iridium.
2001, successfully launched the Senseo coffeemaker, first in the Netherlands and from 2002 onwards, in other countries across Europe. It produces coffee by brewing from custom-made pads containing coffee grounds. The original Senseo pads are produced by Douwe Egberts. The Senseo has been available in the US since 2004.
2004, Philips HomeLabs research center created the Mirror TV technology used in their MiraVision television line.
2006, introduced the Blu-ray Disc in partnership with Sony.
2008, introduced flatscreen with WOW VX technology. (3D TV)
2008, introduced the Relationship Care range of Philips Intimate Massagers to the UK market. The company receives a royalty on every DVD manufactured.
2009, introduced the Philips Cinema 21:9 TV in a widescreen mode for HDTVs with an LCD display using the aspect ratio.

Inventions

Compact Cassette

In 1962 Philips invented the compact audio cassette medium for audio storage. Although there were other magnetic tape cartridge systems, the Compact Cassette became dominant as a result of Philips's decision to license the format free of charge.

Laserdisc

Laserdisc was a 30 cm disc designed with MCA meant to compete with VHS and even replace it. While not as generally popular as VHS, due to the initial investment costs of players, somewhat higher costs of movie titles, the initial read-only format and early manufacturing issues, it eventually enjoyed extensive success among serious video collectors, like its contemporaneous rival Betamax. The technologies created for Laserdisc would later be used again for the Compact Disc.

Compact Disc (CD)

Although Philips' and MCA's Laserdisc project never reached the VHS mass market level, Philips still thought the format should be able to succeed, and, in collaboration with Sony, launched the smaller CD in 1982.

DVD

The DVD (Digital Versatile Disc or Digital Video Disc), the eventual successor of the CD (Compact Disc), met a long road of setbacks. Philips wanted to continue with the CD in a new format called MultiMedia Compact Disc (MMCD), while another group (led by Toshiba) was developing a competing format, then named Super Density (SD) disc. Their representatives approached IBM for advice on the file system. IBM also learned of Philips' and Sony's initiative. IBM convinced a group of computer industry experts (among them Apple, Dell, etc.) to form a working group. The Technical Working Group (TWG) voted to boycott both formats unless they merged to prevent another format war (like the videotape format war). The result was the DVD specification, finalized in 1995. The DVD video format was first introduced in Japan in 1996, later in 1997 in the U.S. as limited test run, then across Europe and the other continents from late 1998 onwards.

Blu-ray Disc

Blu-ray Disc, yet again primarily developed by Philips and Sony, utilizes blue-violet coloured diodes to create an even shorter wavelength beam than CD or DVD. Because of this, the capacity is much more than that of CD or DVD, being 25 GB single-layered or 50 GB dual-layered.

References

External links

General
 Philips Global
 Philips Consumer Electronics website(404)

CE Product departments
  Televisions(404)
 Home entertainment(404)
 Portable entertainment(404)
 PC products(404)

Philips
Dutch companies established in 2008
Companies based in Stamford, Connecticut